Marxist–Leninist Groups was Marxist–Leninist organization in Finland. The MLR were active from 1973 until 1979. They had supporters in a few cities but they always remained a small current with fewer than 200 members. The MLR had close contacts with the Chinese Communist Party and other Nordic Maoist parties.

The MLR were founded early in 1973 to unite local Maoist groups that had been founded around Finland. The Marxist-Leninist Society of Helsinki (HMLS), the first such group, had been active since the late 1960s. The HMLS (like the whole MLR) was mainly active in the radical youth and student movement. The activities of the Maoists were closely followed by the Suojelupoliisi, the KGB and the Communist Party of Finland (SKP), which fiercely condemned the anti-Soviet movement. The MLR were founded after the SKP began expulsions of Maoist cadre from its ranks. 

The organization published two papers, theoretical Punakaarti (Red Guard, 1969–1977) and agitational Lokakuu (October, 1972–1978). MLR had book shops named Lokakuu in Helsinki, Turku and Rauma. In the series "Marxismin klassikoita" (Classics of Marxism) MLR published works by Joseph Stalin, Mao Zedong, Enver Hoxha and Karl Marx.

Many of the members who disbanded the MLR in 1979, including its leader  went to form , which soon began moving away from Marxism-Leninism.

References

Maoist organizations in Europe
Civic and political organisations of Finland